Whiting is a city located in the Chicago Metropolitan Area in Lake County, Indiana, which was founded in 1889. The city is located on the southern shore of Lake Michigan. It is roughly 16 miles from the Chicago Loop and two miles from Chicago's South Side. Whiting is home to Whiting Refinery, the largest oil refinery in the Midwest. The population was 4,997 at the 2010 census.

History
A post office was first established at Whiting in 1871. Whiting was incorporated in 1895. It was named after a trainman who was killed in a crash there.

The Hoosier Theater Building, Henry and Caroline Schrage House, and Whiting Memorial Community House are listed in the National Register of Historic Places.

Geography

The Whiting post office (46394) serves not only the city of Whiting, but also the adjacent Hammond neighborhood of Robertsdale, immediately to the west. Addresses in this Hammond neighborhood show “Whiting, Indiana.” While not legally a part of the city of Whiting, locally the area has long been informally considered to be a culturally integrated part of Whiting. References to Whiting businesses or residents often include those technically from Hammond's Robertsdale.

Demographics

2010 census

As of the census of 2010, there were 4,997 people, 1,899 households, and 1,210 families residing in the city. The racial makeup of the city was 76.3% White, 3.5% African American, 0.7% Native American, 0.7% Asian, 15.7% from other races, and 3.2% from two or more races. Hispanic or Latino of any race were 40.7% of the population.

There were 1,899 households, of which 37.1% had children under the age of 18 living with them, 38.1% were married couples living together, 18.6% had a female householder with no husband present, 7.0% had a male householder with no wife present, and 36.3% were non-families. 30.1% of all households were made up of individuals, and 11.3% had someone living alone who was 65 years of age or older. The average household size was 2.63 and the average family size was 3.32.

The median age in the city was 34.4 years. 26.9% of residents were under the age of 18; 9.4% were between the ages of 18 and 24; 27.3% were from 25 to 44; 24.7% were from 45 to 64; and 11.6% were 65 years of age or older. The gender makeup of the city was 49.1% male and 50.9% female.

Parks

Whiting is home to five parks. Whiting Park, located on the Lake Michigan shoreline, is the most well known. It is a popular picnic spot for residents of Lake County, the South Side of Chicago, and Southland. Whihala Beach is located next to Whiting Park between Whiting and neighboring Hammond.

Education

School City of Whiting serves Whiting. Whiting High School is the sole public high school serving Whiting. The city is also home to a historic Carnegie Library, built in 1905.  Whiting Public Library is located at 1735 Oliver Street.
Calumet College of St. Joseph is a private college affiliated with the Roman Catholic Church through the Missionaries of the Precious Blood.  Its main campus is in Whiting, Indiana, with additional campuses located in Chicago, Illinois, and Merrillville, Indiana.  The college was founded in 1951 as an extension of the now defunct Saint Joseph's College in Rensselaer, Indiana and currently enrolls 1,262 students.

Infrastructure

Transportation
Amtrak's Wolverine line stops at Hammond–Whiting station in nearby Hammond.

Airports serving Whiting are Chicago's O'Hare International Airport, Midway International Airport, and Gary/Chicago International Airport located in Gary, Indiana.

Notes of interest

Pierogi Fest is held each year on 119th Street in downtown Whiting to honor the venerable pierogi dumpling. Spanning three days on Friday, Saturday, and Sunday during the last full weekend of July, the event draws in crowds from around the Calumet Region with guests coming from all over the globe.

The city was featured in an episode of MTV's High School Stories.

Scenes from the movie Rudy, starring Sean Astin, as well as the 1981 drama Four Friends, were shot in Whiting.

Standard Oil of Indiana, later Amoco,  was founded and headquartered here.

The Mascot Hall of Fame, honoring costumed characters from college and professional sports, is located in Whiting.

Notable people
 George Buksar, football player
 George Burman, football player
 William Merriam Burton, worked at the Standard Oil refinery in Whiting; became president of Standard Oil
 Mary-Lou Daniels, junior world champion tennis player
 Richard Dufallo, clarinetist, author, and conductor
 John M. Ford, science fiction and fantasy writer, game designer, and poet; raised in Whiting
 Joe Kopcha, football player
 Steve Kraly, baseball player
 Ferid Murad, co-recipient of 1998 Nobel Prize in Physiology or Medicine
 James J. Nejdl, State Senator and pioneer of Indiana Old-Age Pension Legislation. Former City council member, postmaster general, school board and public work board member.
 Al Pilarcik, baseball player
 Patrick Lucien Price, video game designer and editor; worked on Dungeons & Dragons game
 Irene Purcell, actress
 Joe Sotak, basketball player
 David Wagoner, poet

See Also
 Henry and Caroline Schrage House

External links

City of Whiting, Indiana website
Pierogi Festival website

References

Cities in Indiana
Cities in Lake County, Indiana
Northwest Indiana
Populated places established in 1889
1889 establishments in Indiana
Indiana populated places on Lake Michigan